Paul Charles Rosenbloom (1920 in Portsmouth, Virginia – 2005) was an American mathematician.

Life 
Rosenbloom studied at the University of Pennsylvania, where as an undergraduate he became  a Putnam Fellow in 1941. In 1944 he earned his PhD from Stanford University under Gábor Szegő with thesis On sequences of polynomials, especially sections of power series. He was a professor of mathematics at Brown University, Syracuse University (around 1951), the University of Minnesota (middle to end of the 1950s), and the Teacher's College of Columbia University (from the 1960s to his retirement as professor emeritus). His doctoral students include Henry Gordon Rice.

Rosenbloom's research includes analysis, special functions, differential equations, logic, and the teaching of mathematics. In the academic year 1959–1960 he was the director of the Minnesota School Mathematics Center.

In 1946 he was a Guggenheim Fellow. He was at the Institute for Advanced Study for the academic years 1953–1954 and 1971–1972.

Works 
with P. Erdős: 

The Elements of Mathematical Logic, Dover 1950, 2005
with A. N. Milgram: 
with A. N. Milgram: 
Linear Partial Differential Equations, in George Elmer Forsythe, Rosenbloom: Numerical analysis and partial differential equations, Wiley 1958
with D. V. Widder: 
as editor: Modern viewpoints in the curriculum: National Conference on Curriculum Experimentation, (Conference in 1961), McGraw Hill 1964
with Seymour Schuster: Prelude to Analysis, Prentice–Hall 1966

with A. Evyatar: Motivated Mathematics, Cambridge University Press 1981

References

20th-century American mathematicians
21st-century American mathematicians
1920 births
2005 deaths
University of Pennsylvania alumni
Stanford University alumni
Brown University faculty
Syracuse University faculty
University of Minnesota faculty
Columbia University faculty
Putnam Fellows